Ashvin Balaruban (born 8 August 2001) is a Swiss professional footballer who plays as a left-back for Neuchâtel Xamax.

Club career
On 17 June 2021, he joined Kriens on loan.

On 5 July 2022, Balaruban signed with Neuchâtel Xamax.

Personal life
Born in Switzerland, Balaruban is of Tamil Sri Lankan descent.

Career statistics

Club

Notes

References

2001 births
Sportspeople from Lucerne
Swiss people of Sri Lankan descent
Living people
Swiss men's footballers
Switzerland youth international footballers
Association football defenders
FC Luzern players
SC Kriens players
Neuchâtel Xamax FCS players
Swiss 1. Liga (football) players
Swiss Super League players
Swiss Challenge League players